The Alternative Press Music Awards was an annual music awards show in the United States, founded by the music magazine Alternative Press.

History 
On April 24, 2014, Alternative Press announced they were organizing an award show to be held on July 21, 2014, at the Rock and Roll Hall of Fame and Museum in Cleveland. Mark Hoppus, bassist and vocalist of the pop-punk band Blink-182, hosted the event's debut. The first show was aired live on AXS TV and Idobi Radio nationwide and featured performances from the Misfits, All Time Low, Sleeping with Sirens, Twenty One Pilots and other acts. During the first show the artist was awarded in 15 categories. 12 of the categories were given away by the readers of Alternative Press through an online voting. The inaugural ceremony was attended by 6,000 people, with Fall Out Boy winning Artist of the Year; it featured live performances by Fall Out Boy, Joan Jett & the Blackhearts, the Misfits, A Day to Remember, All Time Low, Falling in Reverse with Tyler Carter and Coolio, Asking Alexandria, Sleeping with Sirens, Twenty One Pilots and Brendon Urie of Panic! at the Disco.

In 2015, the awards ceremony was moved to Cleveland's Quicken Loans Arena. It featured hosts Alex Gaskarth and Jack Barakat of All Time Low and performances by Rob Zombie, Motionless in White, New Found Glory with Hayley Williams of Paramore, Panic! at the Disco and headliners Weezer.

Due to the Republican National Convention, the 2016 APMAs were moved to Value City Arena in Columbus, Ohio. The show included performances by Judas Priest vocalist Rob Halford collaborating with Babymetal, Third Eye Blind with Mayday Parade and the Maine, Black Veil Brides frontman Andy Biersack with Mikey Way, John Feldmann and Quinn Allman, Machine Gun Kelly, Of Mice & Men, Papa Roach, Good Charlotte and headliners A Day to Remember.

The fourth annual show was hosted by Andy Biersack of Black Veil Brides.

List of winners

2014

2015

2016

2017

External links 
 Official Homepage

References 

2014 establishments in Ohio
21st-century awards
Annual events in Ohio
Awards established in 2014
American music awards
Music of Cleveland
Recurring events established in 2014